The Arcadia Formation and its sub-unit, the Tampa Member, are Late Oligocene geologic formations in North Florida, United States. It is part of the Hawthorn Group.

Age
Period: Paleogene to Neogene
Epoch: Early Late Oligocene through Pliocene
Faunal stage: Chattian through early Blancan ~28.4 to ~2.588 mya, calculates to a period of

Location
The Arcadia Formation and Tampa Member is located southwestern flank of the Ocala Platform from Pasco County and southward in to Hillsborough and Sarasota County, Florida. The Tampa Member and the lower part of the Arcadia Formation form the upper part of the Floridan Aquifer system in parts of southern Florida.

Composition
The Arcadia Formation is composed of limestones and dolomites which are yellowish gray to light olive gray to light brown in color. The texture is micro to finely crystalline with varying sandy, clayey limestones and dolomites containing phosphate. The clays are yellowish gray to light olive gray in color. They are moderately hard as well as sandy, silty, phosphatic and dolomitic. Silicified carbonates and opalized claystone have also been found.

Tampa Member
The Tampa Member consists predominantly of limestone with subordinate dolomite, sand and clay very similar to that of the subsurface limestone part of the Arcadia Formation. There is considerably less phosphate. The color is white to yellowish gray. It is fossil bearing and variably sandy and clayey mudstone, wackestone, and packstone with little to no phosphate grains. Sand and clay beds are like those in the undifferentiated sediments of the Arcadia Formation.

Paleofauna
The Arcadia Formation proper contains molds and casts in dolomite containing mollusks. The Tampa Member contains mollusks and corals in molds and casts with silicified pseudomorphs and shell material.

References

USGS Lithostratigraphic Units of Florida
Florida Carbonate "Formations" and Conflicting Interpretations of Injection Well Regulations

Paleogene Florida

Paleogene Georgia (U.S. state)